Jordan Donica is an American actor and singer. He is known for his theatrical roles in musicals such as Hamilton, The Phantom of the Opera, and Camelot, and his television roles in Charmed and Blue Bloods.

Early life 
Donica was born April 18, 1994, in Indianapolis, Indiana. He began performing in local theatre when he was 9, and from the age of 11 was determined to have a career in musical theatre. He went on to study at Otterbein University, where he graduated cum laude with a BFA in Musical Theatre. Some of his university production credits include Les Misérables, Dames at Sea, and Into the Woods

Career 
Donica made his made his Broadway debut in 2016, starring as Raoul, Vicomte de Chagny, in the historic Broadway production of The Phantom of the Opera.

Soon after, he starred as the Marquis de Lafayette and Thomas Jefferson in the first Los Angeles and San Francisco productions of Hamilton. He then returned to Broadway for the role of Freddy Eynsford-Hill in the 2018 Tony-nominated Lincoln Center Theater production of My Fair Lady.

In 2019, he starred as Sir Lancelot in Lincoln Center Theater's gala production of Camelot opposite Lin Manuel Miranda.<ref>{{Cite web |last=Bahr |first=Sarah |title=Indianapolis actor to star in 'Camelot' concert with 'Hamiltons Lin-Manuel Miranda |url=https://www.indystar.com/story/entertainment/2019/02/24/indianapolis-actor-star-camelot-concert-hamilton-lin-manuel-miranda-jordan-donica-theater-broadway/2972059002/ |access-date=2022-03-17 |website=The Indianapolis Star |language=en-US}}</ref> He would reprise this role in a 2023 Broadway revival opposite Andrew Burnap and Phillipa Soo.

In May 2022, he starred as Rapunzel’s Prince in the New York City Center Encores! production of Into the Woods opposite Gavin Creel, Sara Bareilles, Heather Headley, Neil Patrick Harris, and Denée Benton.

Donica joined the main cast for the second season of the CW's Charmed, and guest starred in an episode of Blue Bloods''.

In addition to his theater and TV work, Donica has been featured at the Washington National Opera gala at The Kennedy Center, with the Pasadena Symphony, and with the Indianapolis Symphony Orchestra.

Filmography

Television

Theatre Credits

References 

Living people
1994 births
Male actors from Indianapolis
American male musical theatre actors
American male television actors
21st-century American male actors
Otterbein University alumni
African-American male actors